Claude Platt (3 March 1904 – 13 October 1966) was an Australian sports shooter. He competed in the 50 m rifle event at the 1948 Summer Olympics.

References

1904 births
1966 deaths
Australian male sport shooters
Olympic shooters of Australia
Shooters at the 1948 Summer Olympics
Sportsmen from New South Wales